Shinile is a town in eastern Ethiopia. Located in the Shinile Zone of the Somali Region, it is 9km northeast of Dire Dawa, the first station of the Ethio-Djibouti Railways east of Dire Dawa is at Shinile.

Demographics 
The town's inhabitants belong to various mainly Afro-Asiatic-speaking ethnic groups, with the Issa Somali predominant. Based on figures from the Central Statistical Agency in 2005, Shinile has an estimated total population of 13,132, of whom 6,758 were males and 6,374 were females. The 1997 census reported this town had a total population of 8,809 of whom 4,464 were men and 4,345 women. The three largest ethnic groups reported in this town were the Somali (96.58%), the Oromo (1.76%), and the Amhara (1.5%); all other ethnic groups made up the remaining 0.16% of the residents. It is the largest of four towns in Shinile woreda.

Climate 
Shinile has a hot semi-arid climate (BSh) in Köppen-Geiger system.

Notes 

Populated places in the Somali Region